Ivan Milosavljević (Serbian Cyrillic: Иван Милосављевић; born 14 February 1983) is a Serbian retired football defender.

Career
Born in Smederevo, Milosavljević began playing football in the lower levels of Serbian football. He signed with SuperLiga side FK Smederevo in 2010, and scored his first league goal for the club in a 2–1 victory over FK Inđija on 4 December 2010.

References

External links
 
 Ivan Milosavljević at FuPa

1983 births
Living people
Sportspeople from Smederevo
Serbian footballers
Serbian expatriate footballers
FK Smederevo players
FK Rudar Kostolac players
Serbian SuperLiga players
Association football defenders
Serbian expatriate sportspeople in Germany
Expatriate footballers in Germany